Espoir Sportif de Jerba Midoun (often referred to as ٍُESJM ) is a football club from Djerba in Tunisia. Founded in 1974, the team plays in white and blue colors. Their ground is the Stade Municipal de Midoun, which has a capacity of 10,000.

The club was relegated from League 2 to League 3 at the end of the 2007–08 season.

Honours
Tunisian Coupe de la Ligue Professionnelle: 1
2000/01

Tunisian Coupe de la Ligue Professionnelle 2: 1
2006/07

Football clubs in Tunisia
Association football clubs established in 1976
1976 establishments in Tunisia
Djerba
Sports clubs in Tunisia